William Winstanley ( – death unknown) was an English professional rugby league footballer who played in the 1900s and 1910s. He played at representative level for Great Britain, England and Lancashire, and at club level for Platt Bridge ARLFC (in Platt Bridge, Wigan), Leigh (Heritage № 151), and Wigan (Heritage №), as a forward (prior to the specialist positions of), during the era of contested scrums.

Background
Billy Winstanley was born in Platt Bridge, Wigan, Lancashire, England.

Playing career

International honours
Billy Winstanley, won caps for England while at Leigh in 1910 against Wales, while at Wigan in 1911 against Wales, and Australia, and in 1912 against Wales.

While at Leigh he was selected to go on the 1910 Great Britain Lions tour of Australia and New Zealand, and won caps for Great Britain against Australia, Australasia (2 matches), and New Zealand.

While at Wigan he played in 1911-12 against Australia (3 matches).

County League appearances
Billy Winstanley played in Wigan's victories in the Lancashire County League during the 1910–11 season, 1911–12 season and 1912–13 season.

References

External links
Saints Heritage Society profile

1880s births
England national rugby league team players
English rugby league players
Great Britain national rugby league team players
Lancashire rugby league team players
Leigh Leopards players
Place of death missing
Rugby league players from Wigan
Rugby league forwards
Wigan Warriors players
Year of death missing